Symons is a surname which may refer to:

Arts and entertainment
A. J. A. Symons (1900–1941), English author
Arthur Symons (1865–1945), English poet
Elaine Symons (born 1974), Irish actress
Emily Symons (born 1969), Australian actress
George Gardner Symons (1861–1930), American painter
Jane Symons (born 1959), Australian media consultant, journalist and author
Julian Symons (1912–1994), English author
Kevin Symons (born 1971), US actor
Mel Symons (f. 1900–2000s), Australian media personality
Mitchell Symons (born 1957), English author
Peeter Symons (fl 1629–1636), Flemish painter
Red Symons (born 1949), English-born Australian musician and entertainer
Scott Symons (1933–2009), Canadian author

Education
Benjamin Parsons Symons (1785–1878), English academic administrator
Joyce Symons (1919–2004), Chinese-born female educator 
Thomas Symons (1929–2021), Canadian academic and author
Thomas B. Symons (1880–1970), American academic

Military
George Symons (VC) (1826–1871), British Army officer awarded the Victoria Cross
William Symons (1889–1948), Australian officer awarded the Victoria Cross

Politics
Doug Symons (fl. 1990s), Canadian politician
Elizabeth Symons, Baroness Symons of Vernham Dean (born 1951), English politician

Sciences
Donald Symons (born 1942), American anthropologist
George James Symons (1838–1900), English meteorological pioneer

Sports
B. J. Symons (born 1980), US athlete in football
Bill Symons (born 1943), US-born Canadian athlete in football
Elmer Symons (born 1977), South African motorcycle rider
Jack Symons (1912–unknown), Australian athlete in football
Kit Symons (born 1971), Welsh international footballer
Michael Symons (born 1971), Australian athlete in football
Mike Symons (1918–1984), English athlete in canoe
Ruth Symons (1914–2004), New Zealand female athlete in cricket

Other
Ernest Symons (1913–1990), English government official
Gordon Symons (1928–2012), Canadian writer and businessman
Harry L. Symons (1892–1962), Canadian writer and businessman
Joseph Keith Symons (born 1932), American Catholic bishop

See also 
 Simmons (surname)
 Simmons (disambiguation)
 Simons
 Symon
 Symonds

Patronymic surnames
Surnames from given names